Jennifer Rene Psaki (born December 1, 1978) is an American television political analyst who currently works for MSNBC.  Previously, she was a political advisor who served under both the Obama and Biden administrations.  Immediately prior to working for MSNBC, she served the Biden administration as the 34th White House press secretary during 2021 and 2022. A member of the Democratic Party, she previously served in the Obama administration as the White House deputy press secretary (2009); the White House deputy communications director (2009–2011); the spokesperson for the United States Department of State (2013–2015); and the White House communications director (2015–2017). Psaki was a political contributor for CNN from 2017 to 2020.

Early life and education
Psaki, the eldest of three daughters, was born in Stamford, Connecticut, in 1978 to psychotherapist Eileen (née Dolan) Medvey and Dimitrios "James" R. Psaki, a retired real estate developer whose grandfather had emigrated from Greece in 1904 and whose grandmother was of Irish descent. Her parents married in 1976. Psaki also has Polish ancestry.

Psaki graduated from Greenwich High School in 1996. In 2000, she graduated from the College of William & Mary with a degree in English and sociology. She is a member of the Chi Omega sorority. At William & Mary, Psaki was a competitive backstroke swimmer for the William & Mary Tribe athletic team for two years.

Career

Early career 
Psaki began her career in 2001 with the re-election campaigns of Iowa Democrats Tom Harkin for the U.S. Senate and Tom Vilsack for governor. Psaki then became deputy press secretary for John Kerry's 2004 presidential campaign. From 2005 to 2006, Psaki served as communications director to U.S. representative Joseph Crowley and regional press secretary for the Democratic Congressional Campaign Committee.

Obama administration 
Throughout the 2008 presidential campaign of U.S. senator Barack Obama, Psaki served as traveling press secretary. After Obama won the election, Psaki followed Obama to the White House as deputy press secretary and was promoted to deputy communications director on December 19, 2009. On September 22, 2011, Psaki left this position to become senior vice president and managing director at the Washington, D.C., office of public relations firm Global Strategy Group.

In 2012, Psaki returned to political communications as press secretary for President Obama's 2012 reelection campaign. On February 11, 2013, Psaki became the spokesperson for the United States Department of State. Her hiring at the Department of State fueled speculation that she would replace White House Press Secretary Jay Carney when he left the White House, but, on May 30, 2014, it was announced that Josh Earnest would replace Carney. In 2015, she returned to the White House as communications director and stayed through the end of the Obama administration.

On February 7, 2017, Psaki began working as a political commentator on CNN.

White House press secretary 

In November 2020, Psaki left CNN and joined the Biden–Harris transition team. Later that month, Psaki was named as the White House press secretary for the Biden administration.

She held her first press briefing on the evening of January 20, 2021, after the inauguration. On May 6, in an interview with former Senior Advisor to the President David Axelrod, Psaki suggested she would depart from the position of press secretary "in about a year from now". In October, Psaki was accused by a watchdog group of violating the Hatch Act for her comments on the 2021 Virginia gubernatorial election. On November 2, Psaki announced that she had tested positive for COVID-19. After quarantining, she returned to work on November 12, after fully recovering, and crediting her vaccination status for her recovery without complications.

On March 22, 2022, Psaki tested positive for COVID-19 for the second time in six months and did not accompany President Biden on his trip to Europe. On April 1, Axios reported that Psaki would likely leave the White House "around May" for a job with MSNBC. On May 5, the White House announced she would be leaving the role on May 13, and named her principal deputy, Karine Jean-Pierre, as her replacement.

Later career 
MSNBC announced that Psaki will serve as a political analyst throughout the 2022 United States elections and during the 2024 presidential campaign. She will also host a show on MSNBC's Peacock streaming service in 2023. Psaki made her first television appearance after leaving her position as White House Press Secretary on The Tonight Show Starring Jimmy Fallon discussing the Robb Elementary School shooting.

Psaki will host her first weekly series on MSNBC beginning on Sunday, March 19, 2023, called Inside With Jen Psaki and be rerun on Peacock the next day.

Personal life 
On May 8, 2010, Psaki married Greg Mecher, then chief of staff to Congressman Steve Driehaus. Later, Mecher served as chief of staff to Congressman Joe Kennedy. The couple met at the Democratic Congressional Campaign Committee in 2006. They have two children.

References

External links

 
 Archived copy of Psaki's official Twitter account from the Obama administration
 

|-

|-

1978 births
Living people
21st-century American women
American people of Greek descent
American people of Irish descent
American people of Polish descent
American public relations people
Barack Obama 2008 presidential campaign
Barack Obama 2012 presidential campaign
Biden administration personnel
CNN people
Connecticut Democrats
Greenwich High School alumni
John Kerry 2004 presidential campaign
MSNBC people
Obama administration personnel
People from Greenwich, Connecticut
People from Stamford, Connecticut
United States Department of State spokespeople
White House Communications Directors
White House Press Secretaries
William & Mary Tribe women's swimmers